The northern glider (Petaurus abidi) is a species of marsupial in the family Petauridae. It is endemic to Papua New Guinea, becoming known to science in 1981 after being discovered in the Torricelli Mountains. This species has been found in primary, mid-montane tropical moist forests. It is also known from rural gardens close to forest. The northern glider is Critically Endangered because its occurrence is less than 100 km2, all individuals are located within a single area, and a continuing decline of its habitat quality due to deforestation and human encroachment. They also face a major threat from hunting.

Appearance
The northern glider ranges in weight of 228–332 grams. Its silky-like fur is gray on the top half, paler on the bottom regions, and includes the characteristic dark dorsal stripe of the family Petauridae that typically begins from the head extending to the base of tail.

References

Gliding possums
Endemic fauna of Papua New Guinea
Marsupials of New Guinea
Mammals of Papua New Guinea
Critically endangered fauna of Oceania
Mammals described in 1981
Taxonomy articles created by Polbot
Taxobox binomials not recognized by IUCN